Robert Earl "Squirrel" Lester (August 16, 1942 – January 21, 2010) was the second tenor in the Chicago-based singing group The Chi-Lites.

Lester was born in McComb, Mississippi. He was part of the original Chi-Lites line-up when the group (then named 'The Hi-Lites') were first formed in 1960 from two Chicago groups — The Desideros and The Chantours (Lester had been a member of the latter). He was included in the Chi-Lites line-up, along with group leader Marshall Thompson, lead vocalist Frank Reed, and backing vocalist, Tara Thompson.

An inductee at the Vocal Group Hall of Fame, Lester was 67 years old at the time of his death. He died at Roseland Hospital in Chicago after a long battle with liver cancer.

References

1942 births
2010 deaths
American male singers
People from McComb, Mississippi
American tenors
The Chi-Lites members
Deaths from cancer in Illinois 
Deaths from liver cancer